The Romani people are a distinct ethnic and cultural group of peoples living all across the globe, who share a family of languages and sometimes a traditional nomadic mode of life. Though their exact origins are unclear, central India is a notable point of origin. Their language shares a common origin with, and is similar to, modern-day Gujarati and Rajasthani, borrowing loan words from other languages as they migrated from India. In Europe, even though their culture has been victimized by other cultures, they have still found a way to maintain their heritage and society. Romani culture is influenced by Indian culture and European culture.

Origins 

Linguistic and phonological research has traced the Roma people's origin to places in the Indian subcontinent, specifically linking Proto-Romani groups to Central India. Many report in extracts from popular literature that Romani emerged from the North-west regions of India, rather than from Central India. Features of phonological developments which emerged during the early transition stage from Old to Middle Indic prove that the history of Romani began in Central India. The Romani language shares many features with the Central Indo-Aryan languages such as Hindi, Urdu, Punjabi and Rajasthani; it also shares connections with Northern Indo-Aryan languages like Kashmiri, and the language itself contains a cluster of Persian and Arabic words. Linguists use these phonological similarities as well as features of phonological developments which emerged during the early transition stage from Old Sanskrit to Middle Indic Prakrit to conclude that the history of Romani began in Central India.

In Hungary there is a claim that the Roma are descendants of the untouchable, the Dalits, who came to Europe from India between 400 and 500 AD. There is a genetic study which clearly shows that Roma are genetically close to Indian untouchables or descended from Indian Dalits.

Another legend described the Persian king Bahram V, who took musicians from India to Iran at 420–438 AD, then wandered over the silk road to Europe. Some believe the Roma are their descendants.

Names 
The Romani people are today found across the world. Typically, Roma adopt given names that are common in the country of their residence. Seldom do modern Roma use the traditional name from their own language, such as Čingaren. Romanes is the only Indo-Aryan language that has been spoken exclusively around Europe since the Middle Ages. Speakers use many terms for their language. They generally refer to their language as Čingari čhib or řomani čhib translated as ‘the Romani language’, or romanes, ‘in a Rom way’. The English term, Romani, has been used by scholars since the 19th Century, where previously they had used the term 'Gypsy Language'.

Family and life stages 
Traditionally, Roma place a high value on the extended family.

Marriage and controversies

Marriage in Romani society underscores the importance of family and demonstrates ties between different groups, often transnationally. Traditionally an arranged marriage is highly desirable. It is custom for the parents of the groom to pay the family of the daughter. Parents of the potential bridal couple help identify an ideal partner for their child. Parents may pressure a particular spouse on their child, because it is an established norm to be married by your mid-twenties. School, church, weddings, and other events are also popular environments for finding a prospective spouse. Potential couples are expected to be  supervised or chaperoned by an adult. With the emergence of both social media such as Facebook and mobile phones, and the advancing education of women, many traditional mores and conservative views have become less rigid. In some Romani groups, for example the Finnish Roma, the idea of a legally registered marriage is ignored altogether.

The Romani practice of child marriage has generated substantial controversy across the world. In 2003, one of the many self-styled Romani "kings", Ilie Tortică, prohibited marriage before the parties were of legal age in their country of residence. A Romani patriarch, Florin Cioabă, ran afoul of Romanian authorities in late 2003 when he married off his youngest daughter, Ana-Maria, at the age of twelve, well below the legal marriageable age.

Bride kidnapping (not to be confused with the Romanian bride kidnapping tradition) is believed to be a traditional part of Romani practice. Girls as young as twelve years old may be kidnapped for marriage to teenage boys. This practice has been reported in Ireland, England, the Czech Republic, the Netherlands, Bulgaria and Slovakia. Bride kidnapping is thought to be a way to avoid a bride price or a means for a girl to marry a boy she wants but that her parents do not want. The tradition's normalisation of kidnapping puts young women at higher risk of becoming victims of human trafficking.

The practices of bride kidnapping and child marriage are not universally accepted throughout Romani culture. Some Romani women and men seek to eliminate such customs.

Romani mothers breastfeed their children for optimal health and increased immunity. They also view this as a gift from God, and a help to building healthy relationships between mothers and children.

Purity and death
Clothes for the lower body, as well as the clothes of menstruating women, are washed separately. Items used for eating are washed in a different place.

Childbirth is considered "impure" and must occur outside the dwelling place; the mother is considered "impure" for 40 days.

Childraising 
Romani people incorporate their values into how they raise their children. There is an element of impurity placed upon both the mother and father after the mother gives birth. This impurity is lessened if the child is a male and the family is considered "lucky". Traditionally, the couple will live with the father of the groom until their first child is born. Romani people place high value on extended family so godparents, along with this other family, are active in the child's life to ensure its well-being.

Moral values 
The culture and tradition of Dasikane (Christian) Roma and Horahane (Muslim) Roma is very different. There is no single roma culture or tradition, it differs from country, subgroups and religion.

Romanipen

An ethnic Rom is considered to be a Gadjikane Roma in Romani society if the person has no Romanipen. Sometimes a Gadjo, usually an adopted child, may be considered to be a Rom if the person has Romanipen. As a concept, Romanipen has been the subject of interest to numerous academic observers. It has been hypothesized that it owes more to a framework of culture than simply an adherence to historically received rules.

Significant changes in Romani culture following the Second World War have been attributed to the suspension of these social norms, as strict rules relating to food and contact with certain classes of people broke down. This period also coincided with a perceived loss of authority invested in traditional leaders, the primary maintainers of Romanipen. Furthermore, the Roma who found themselves under Soviet control during the war, while deported to the east of the Urals and often persecuted, were generally left alone to follow their orthodox practices and thus preserved strict interpretations of Romanipen. However, the Roma who lived in other countries of eastern Europe, in the face of widespread discrimination and society's attempts at forced assimilation, often had to compromise their strict interpretation of the customs to survive. As a result, the whole concept of Romanipen became interpreted differently among various Roma groups. Muslim Roma as example considered an uncircumcised Man as impure.

Being a part of Romani society 
A considerable punishment for a Rom is banishment from Romani society. An expelled person is considered to be "contaminated" and is shunned by other Romanis.

Romani Code 
Romani Code, or Romano Zakono, is the most important part of Romanipen. It is a set of rules for Romani life. It differs from Groups and Religions.

Though Romani ethnic groups have different sets of rules, Oral Romani cultures are most likely to adhere to the Romani code, these communities are geographically spread. There are proverbs about the Romani Code and customs, such as:

 There exist as many customs as there are Romani groups. (Kitsyk Roma, dakitsyk obychaye in Ruska Roma's dialect)
 There are many Romani groups, but the Romani Law is One. ( in Ruska Roma's and Kaldarash dialects)

Rules of Romani Code describe relationships inside the Romani community and set limits for customs, behavior and other aspects of life.

The Romani Code is not written; Romani people keep it alive in oral tradition.

The kris is a traditional institution for upholding and enforcing the Romani Code.

The code can be summarised in pillars; the main pillar representing the polar ideas of baxt (pronounced "baht") meaning honour and ladž (pronounced "Ladge") meaning shame.

It is honourable, in some Romani cultures, to celebrate baxt by being generous and displaying your success to the public. The focus on generosity means sharing food is of great importance to some groups of Roma. Making lavish meals to share with other Romani visitors is commonplace and in some cases not having food to share is considered shameful.

Faith and religion

Hinduism
While in India, the ancestors of the Romani people followed the Hindu religion. This theory is supported by the Romani word for "cross", trushul, which is the word which describes Shiva's trident (Trishul). If something does not fit into it's natural place, it is considered to be out of balance, and therefore bad luck. For example, birds are supposed to fly, so flightless birds like hens are considered to be out of balance and bad luck. For this reason, Roma traditionally do not eat hens' eggs.

Dasikane Roma
Many branches of Christianity, like Eastern Orthodox Church and Catholic Church, Protestantism and in modern time several evangelical groups have been adopted by Roma. In Romani language a Christian Roma is named Dasikane, the meaning is sometimes given as a slave or servant

Deities and saints

Blessed Ceferino Giménez Malla is considered a patron saint of the Romani people in Roman Catholicism. Saint Sarah, or Kali Sara, has been revered as a patron saint in the same manner as the Blessed Ceferino Giménez Malla, but a transition occurred in the 21st century, whereby Kali Sara is understood as an Indian deity brought by the refugee ancestors of the Romani people, thereby removing any Christian association. Saint Sarah is progressively being considered as "a Romani goddess, the Protectress of the Roma" and an "indisputable link with Mother India".

Christian Roma Ceremonies and practices
Roma often adopt the dominant religion of their host country if a ceremony associated with a formal religious institution is necessary, such as a baptism or funeral (their particular belief systems and indigenous religion and worship remain preserved regardless of such adoption processes). Some Roma continue to practice "Shaktism", a practice with origins in India, whereby a female consort is required for the worship of a god. Adherence to this practice means that for the Romani who worship a Christian God, prayer is conducted through the Virgin Mary, or her mother, Saint Anne. Shaktism continues over 1,000 years after the people's separation from India.

Romani elders serve as spiritual leaders; there are no specific Christian Roma priests, churches, or Christian Roma scriptures, the exception being the Pentecostal Roma, most in Western society.

Within the United Kingdom, a large proportion of British Roma (40% by some estimates) are members of Light and Life, a Charismatic Pentecostal Christian movement.

Burial of the foreskin
It is a custom among Muslim Roma that the foreskin must be buried after Sunet Bijav, (Religious male circumcision ceremony). They believe the foreskin will come back to men in Paradise (Jannah), based a Hadith from Sahih al-Bukhari 6524: The Prophet (Sallallahu Alaihi wa Sallam) said: "You will be raised on the Day of Judgement barefooted, naked, and uncircumcized (with foreskin)." Burying the foreskin is also a tradition among Malaysian Muslims.

Balkan Roma Muslims
For the Muslim Romani communities that have resided in the Balkans for centuries, often referred to as Horahane Roma or "Turkish Gypsies", all Muslim Roma got a Religious male circumcision, the following histories apply for religious beliefs:

 Bulgaria: In northwestern Bulgaria and Sofia and Kyustendil, Islam has been the dominant religion. In southwestern Bulgaria (Pirin Macedonia), Islam is the dominant religion, with a smaller section of the population, declaring themselves as "Turks", continuing to mix ethnicity with Islam.
 Romania: Muslim Roma Minority at the Dobruja.
 Greece: Muslim Roma in Western Thrace.
 Albania: Albania's Romani people are all Muslims.
 Macedonia: The majority of Romani people believe in Islam.
 Serbia: in the disputed territory of Kosovo the vast majority of the Romani population is Muslim.
 Bosnia, Montenegro and Herzegovina: Islam is the dominant religion.
 Croatia: Following World War II, a large number of Muslim Roma relocated to Croatia (the majority moved from Kosovo).

In the Balkans, the Roma of North Macedonia and southern Serbia, including the disputed territory of Kosovo, have been particularly active in Islamic mystical brotherhoods (Sufism)—Muslim Roma immigrants to Western Europe and America have brought these traditions with them.

Other regions
Ukraine and Russia contain Romani Muslim populations, as the families of Balkan migrants continue to live there. The descendants' ancestors settled on the Crimean peninsula during the 17th and 18th centuries, but most descendants migrated to Ukraine, southern Russia and the Povolzhie (along the Volga River). Formally, Islam is the religion that these communities align themselves with, and the people are recognized for their staunch preservation of the Romani language and identity.

Most Eastern European Roma are Roman Catholic, Eastern Orthodox, or Muslim. Those in Western Europe and the United States are mostly Roman Catholic or Protestant. In southern Spain, many Roma are Pentecostal, but this is a small minority that has emerged in contemporary times. In Egypt, the Roma are split into Christian and Muslim populations. For countless years, dance has been considered a religious procedure for the Egyptian Roma. In Turkey, the Romani people are Muslim and the males are circumcised, while the majority of Roma in Latin America have maintained their European religions, with most following Eastern Orthodox Christianity.

Evangelicalism
Since World War II, a growing number of Roma have embraced Evangelical movements. For the first time, Roma became ministers and created their own, autonomous churches and missionary organizations. In some countries, the majority of Roma belong to Romani churches. This unexpected change has greatly contributed to a better image of Roma in society. The work they perform is seen as more legitimate, and they have begun to obtain legal permits for commercial activities.

Buddhism
Theravada Buddhism linked to the Dalit Buddhist movement of B.R. Ambedkar has spread among European Roma, particularly in Hungary, although it is still a minority.

Dance 

Romani dances are influenced by Indian dances. A Romani dance that originated from India is the snake dance. Romani women perform the sapera dance with a cobra to awakened their reptilian powers, mantras and to curse menacing victims forever.

Music 

The lăutari who perform at traditional Romanian weddings are virtually all Roma, although their music draws heavily from a vast variety of ethnic traditions—for example Romanian, Turkish, Jewish, and Slavic—as well as Romani traditions. Probably the most internationally prominent contemporary performer in the lăutari tradition is Taraful Haiducilor. Zdob şi Zdub, one of the most prominent rock bands in Moldova, although not Roma themselves, draw heavily on Romani music, as do Spitalul de Urgenţă in Romania.

Flamenco music and dance came from the Roma in Spain; the distinctive sound of Romani music has also strongly influenced bolero, jazz, and Cante Jondo in Europe. European-style Gypsy jazz is still widely practised among the original creators (the Romani People); one who acknowledged this artistic debt was Django Reinhardt.

Classical music 
Romani music is very important in Eastern European cultures such as Hungary, Russia, and Romania. Performance practices by Romani musicians have influenced European classical composers such as Franz Liszt and Johannes Brahms.

Language

The Romani language is spoken by millions of Romani people throughout the world. It is of the Indo-Aryan branch. Many Romani people can speak two or more languages. It is not considered an official language because it varies from tribe to tribe.

Observances

Each June, Gypsy Roma Traveller History Month is celebrated in London. International Romani Day is a holiday celebrated in Europe, especially in Budapest, Bulgaria, Romania and Eastern Europe, on April 8.

Theatre, circus and cinema 

There exist four well-known Romani theatres in the world, Romen Theatre, Romance Theatre, Romanothan and Phralipe, and also many small theatres.

Cuisine

Horse meat is forbidden. Any Roma who eats horse meat is punished and banished from their tribe. Cat meat and dog meat are also forbidden and are considered unclean.

Romani tea is similar to Russian tea and stuffed cabbage is popular among the Roma. Berries, vegetables, mushrooms, hedgehog, game and fowl are favored by the Roma.

There is a Romani restaurant called Romani Kafenava in Maribor, Slovenia. Rabbit stew is a Romani favorite. Other Romani dishes are fried bread dishes, including xaritsa (fried cornbread), pufe (fried wheat bread) and bogacha (baked bread). A Romani dessert is pirogo, a sweet noodle casserole similar to Jewish kugel made with raisins, cream cheese, and butter.

Fortune-telling

A stereotype that Romani people have psychic powers (e.g. fortune-teller) is still sometimes present, and some romantics attribute the invention of the Tarot cards to them.

Relations with other people 

Because of their nomadic lifestyle and differences in language and culture, Roma and their more settled neighbours have held each other in distrust. The popular image of Roma as tramps and thieves unfit for work contributed to their widespread persecution. This belief is often cited as the etymological source of the term gyp, meaning to "cheat", as in "I got gypped by a con man."

There are still tensions between Roma and the majority population around them. Common complaints are that Roma steal and live off social welfare and residents often reject Romani encampments. This has led to Roma being described as "perhaps the most hated minority in Europe." In the UK, travellers (referring to both Irish Travellers and Roma) became a 2005 general election issue, with Michael Howard, the then-leader of the Conservative Party promising to review the Human Rights Act 1998. This law, which absorbs the European Convention on Human Rights into UK primary legislation, is seen by some to permit the granting of retrospective planning permission for Romani communities. Severe population pressures and the paucity of greenfield sites have led to travellers purchasing land and setting up residential settlements almost overnight, thus subverting the planning restrictions imposed on other members of the community. Travellers argued in response that thousands of retrospective planning permissions are granted in Britain in cases involving non-Romani applicants each year and that statistics showed that 90% of planning applications by Roma and travellers were initially refused by local councils, compared with a national average of 20% for other applicants, potentially disproving claims of preferential treatment favouring Roma. They also argued that the root of the problem was that many traditional stopping-places had been barricaded off and that legislation passed by the previous Conservative government had effectively criminalised their communities by removing local authorities' responsibility to provide sites, thus leaving the travellers with no option but to purchase unregistered new sites themselves.

Law enforcement agencies in the United States hold regular conferences on the Roma and similar nomadic groups.

In Denmark, there was much controversy when the city of Helsingør decided to put all Romani students in special classes in its public schools. The classes were later abandoned after it was determined that they were discriminatory and the Romani students were put back in regular classes.

Romani people avoid gadje because non-Romani are believed to be polluting and defile the Romani world.

Roma in Eastern Europe 

In Eastern Europe, Roma often live in depressed squatter communities with very high unemployment, while only some are fully integrated in the society. However, in some cases—notably the Kalderash clan in Romania, who work as traditional coppersmiths—they have prospered. Although some Roma still embrace a nomadic lifestyle, most migration is actually forced, as most communities do not accept Romani settlements. However, each year in May approximately 10,000 to 15,000 Romani people go on a pilgrimage to Les-Saintes-Marie-de-la-Mer in Southern France. Roma arrive in caravans for celebrations, weddings and religious ceremonies.

Many countries that were formerly part of the Eastern bloc and former Yugoslavia have substantial populations of Roma. The level of integration of Roma into society remains limited. In these countries, they usually remain on the margins of society, living in isolated, ghetto-like settlements (see Chánov). Only a small fraction of Romani children graduate from secondary schools, though numerous official efforts have been made, past and present, to compel their attendance. Roma frequently feel rejected by the state and the main population, creating another obstacle to their integration.

In the Czech Republic, 75% of Romani children are educated in schools for people with learning difficulties and 70% are unemployed, compared with a national rate of 9%. In Hungary, 44% of Romani children are in special schools, while 74% of men and 83% of women are unemployed. In Slovakia, Romani children are 28 times more likely to be sent to a special school than non-Roma, whilst Romani unemployment stands at 80%.

In 2004, Lívia Járóka and Viktória Mohácsi of Hungary became the two current Romani Members of the European Parliament. The first Romani MEP was Juan de Dios Ramírez Heredia of Spain.

Seven former Communist Central European and Southeastern European states launched the Decade of Roma Inclusion initiative in 2005 to improve the socioeconomic conditions and status of the Romani minority.

See also
 Flag of the Romani people
 Gadjo (non-Romani)
 Museum of Romani Culture
 Rom baro (tribal leader)
 Romani dress
 Romani folklore
 Romani studies
 Romani cuisine

References

External links 
 A Roma Journey—explores Romani culture in the Balkans and beyond, including digitised texts, photographs, paintings and recordings of traditional songs.
 Gypsy law by Peter T. Leeson
 The Economics of Gypsies—Freakonomics
 Romani Lives—Lungo Drom
 Mention of romanipe as being a Rom
 Roma culture and traditions: the ROMANIPEN
 Mention of romanipe as the Romani Code 
 Mention of romanipe as Romani culture 
 Mention of romanipe as being a Rom 
 Romowie - bliscy i dalecy. A short definition of romanipe in the text 
 Romanipen-sistemul valorilor rome—BBC News 

Romani culture